Leonard Wilkins (20 September 1925 – August 2003) was a professional footballer who played his entire career (at half-back) for Southampton from 1945 to 1958. 

In 1958, he emigrated to Canada and played in the National Soccer League with the Polish White Eagles.

References

External links
Report of his death
Obituary

1925 births
2003 deaths
Footballers from Southampton
English footballers
Southampton F.C. players
Association football defenders
Canadian National Soccer League players
Expatriate soccer players in Canada
English expatriate footballers